Lomond School is a private, co-educational, day and boarding school in Helensburgh, Argyll and Bute, Scotland. Lomond School is, currently, the only day and boarding school on the west coast of Scotland. It was formed from a merger in 1977 between Larchfield School (founded 1845 and previously called Larchfield Academy) and St Bride's School for Girls (founded 1895).

Lomond School primarily teaches to the Scottish Education System, but in pupils' senior years (S5 & S6) at the school they can move into the one of the International Baccalaureate programmes. The IB programmes were introduced in August 2021.

It is a member school of the Headmasters' and Headmistresses' Conference.

The principal of the school is Johanna Urquhart, who took over from the previous headmaster, Simon Mills, in August 2014.

History
Lomond School was the result of a merger between Larchfield School (founded 1845 and previously called Larchfield Academy) and St Bride's School for Girls (founded 1895) in 1977.

Larchfield Academy (often called Larchfield School) was a preparatory school for boys in Colquhoun Street, Helensburgh and was founded in 1858. Larchfield Academy had existed in various forms and in other buildings prior to that, with the original year of foundation given as 1845. The old school building was purchased along side the newly-completed Larchfield Academy in 1858 by James S. Scott.

The school originally used both the Larchfield and St Brides sites. In February 1997, the St Brides building burnt down in a fire. In October 1998, a replacement building was built on the St Brides site and incorporated elements of the former building that were not destroyed by the fire. The design of the new building was completed by senior master Ian McKellar, an architect turned graphic communication teacher at Lomond, and Glasgow-based architects G D Lodge. The Larchfield site was also sold at around the same time.

Notable former pupils

John Logie Baird
Fiona Burnet, field hockey
Alexander Murray Drennan FRSE (1884-1984) Professor of Pathology
James George Frazer, Scottish social anthropologist, classicist and folklorist
Vicki Hopkinson, artist
Bonar Law
Dr John Edwin MacKenzie FRSE (1868-1955) chemist
Alexander Ure, 1st Baron Strathclyde

References

External links
Lomond School
Profile on the Independent Schools Council website
1966 All school photo via Steve Kropper

Boarding schools in Argyll and Bute
Member schools of the Headmasters' and Headmistresses' Conference
Private schools in Argyll and Bute
Primary schools in Argyll and Bute
Secondary schools in Argyll and Bute
Helensburgh
International Baccalaureate schools in Scotland